The Odessa uezd was one of the subdivisions of the Kherson Governorate of the Russian Empire. It was situated in the southwestern part of the governorate. Its administrative centre was Odessa.

Demographics
At the time of the Russian Empire Census of 1897, Odessky Uyezd had a population of 610,042. Of these, 37.4% spoke Russian, 22.0% Yiddish, 21.9% Ukrainian, 10.3% German, 3.0% Polish, 1.4% Bulgarian, 1.2% Greek, 1.2% Moldovan or Romanian, 0.3% Belarusian, 0.2% Tatar, 0.2% Armenian, 0.2% French, 0.1% Italian, 0.1% Czech, 0.1% Latvian, 0.1% Lithuanian, 0.1% English and 0.1% Turkish as their native language.

References

 
Uezds of Kherson Governorate
Kherson Governorate